Italy competes at the 2018 European Championships in Berlin, Germany; and Glasgow, United Kingdom from 2 to 12 August 2018 in 7 sports.

Medals
In the table the official medal table of the 2018 European Championships.

Athletics

Italy participates with 91 competitors (51 men, 40 women) at the 2018 European Athletics Championships.
Medals

Aquatics

Swimming

Medals

Diving
Medals

Open water swimming
Medals

Synchronised swimming

Italy finished the European championship with 9 medals in 9 events (4 silver and 5 bronze) at the 3rd place in the medal table.
Medals

Cycling

Track

Italy finished the European championship with 5 medals (2 gold) at the 5th place in the medal table.
Medals

Road
Medals

Mountain bike
Medals

Golf
Italy participates with six competitors (four men and two women) on three teams: Lorenzo Gagli and Guido Migliozzi (Italy 1 – men's team), Francesco Laporta and Alessandro Tadini (Italy 2 – men's team), Diana Luna and Stefania Avanzo (with Gagli and Migliozzi – mixed team).

Medals

Gymnastics
Men's finalists

Women's finalists

Rowing
Italy finished the European championship with 6 medals (2 gold) at the 3rd place in the medal table.
Medals

Triathlon
Best results

See also
 Italy national athletics team
 Italy national swimming team

References

External links
 European Championships official site 
 Italian National Olympic Committee official site 

2018
Nations at the 2018 European Championships
2018 in Italian sport